Kendriya Vidyalaya Army Cantt. Pangode ( KV Pangode) is a co-educational central higher secondary school in Army Cantt. Pangode, Thirumala, Thiruvananthapuram, Kerala, India. It was established on 1 August 1980, under the Defence Sector.  It operates from Monday to Saturday, with an 8:25 am–2:40 pm schedule.  The principal of the school is Dr Cicy Roy Mathew.

Infrastructure
The school has classes I to XII, affiliated to CBSE, with three sections each in classes up to X and four section each in classes XI and XII. The Vidyalaya offers Science, Commerce & Humanities streams at XI and XII levels.  The school has coaches for games and sports, craft teachers, computer instructors and spoken English teachers on their staff. There are labs for physics, chemistry and biology, and a Junior Science lab. There are three computer labs on the campus. From 2017, a new ATAL TINKERING lab has been developed to ignite curiosity in the minds of students and help them built the things of their dreams. The lab is facilitated with newest scientific equipments including a 3D printer. The school has a football court, a volleyball court, a basketball court and a playground.

Subjects 
Subjects studied include English, Hindi, mathematics, information technology, art, social science, Sanskrit and German.

Students in classes XI and XII are offered three streams: Science, Commerce and Humanities. Science stream is allotted for students with more than 7.6 CGPA in class X, 6.4 CGPA for commerce and 6 CGPA for humanities.

Student Council 
The Student Council is a body of student representatives consisting of Discipline captains, CCA captain, Swachhatha captains and Sports captain, led by the School Pupil Leaders assisted by Deputy School Pupil Leaders. Besides these representatives there are also house representatives consisting of the house captains and vice house captains for both boys and girls. They are in charge of controlling and conducting programs, school discipline, sports activities, and cultural programs and activities of the students.

House system 
All the students from class I and some of the staff are divided among houses: Ganga, Yamuna, Krishna and Cauveri. Each house is headed by a boy and a girl, and a staff member acts as the house master. Points are awarded to the students for co-curricular activities (CCA) through inter-house competitions in sports, dramatics, debates, quiz, art and music. At the end of the year, the house gaining the highest points is awarded the house trophy and the runner up is also rewarded.

Clubs 
 Literary Club
 Science Club
 Mathematics Club
 Readers Club
 Adventure Club
 Philatelic Club
 IT Club
 Eco Club
 Photography Club

Sports 

The Vidyalaya has teams for basketball, football, kho-kho, volleyball, badminton and cricket, conducting training after school hours. Two students have gone to nationals. The school hosts the U-16 and U-19 cricket matches for cluster as well as regional level.

Youth Parliament 
A team from the school came first position in the 24th and 25th National Level Youth Parliament Competitions, organised by Ministry of Parliamentary Affairs. In the 26th Youth Parliament they emerged as the regional winners from Ernakulam Region.

Notable alumni
 Parvathi, actress

See also 
 Kendriya Vidyalaya Sangathan
 List of schools in Thiruvananthapuram
 Kendriya Vidyalaya, Pattom
 CBSE

References

External links 

Schools in Thiruvananthapuram district
Kendriya Vidyalayas in Kerala
1980 establishments in Kerala